Rosalie Stahl (October 29, 1868 – 1955) was a Canadian-born American stage actress.

Early life
Her father was Col. Ernest Karl Stahl, a Prussian-born newspaperman who was drama and music critic for the Chicago InterOcean and her mother, Catherine McDonald, was born in Canada to a Scottish father and Irish mother. Rose was born in Montreal and spent her formative years in Chicago, where her father worked. She later moved to Trenton, New Jersey when her father became editor of the Trenton Herald.

Career

She made her debut in Philadelphia in 1887, toured with Daniel E. Bandmann in 1888, and appeared in New York in 1897. In 1902–03 she starred as Janice Meredith in a road touring version of the play of that name. She first appeared in her role of Patricia O'Brien in 1904 in the sketch called The Chorus Girl, which she carried to London in 1906, and she reappeared in New York in the revised four-act play, The Chorus Lady, in which she made a sensation.

She had until this time remained largely unknown to the theatre watching public, yet by 1907 had "jumped to the front in the theatrical firmament" and was drawing comparisons with David Warfield. She appeared in Lexington, Kentucky for the first time towards the end of 1907, where she was described as a "theatrical star of the first magnitude". Following her performances in The Chorus Lady, she was held in high regard by critics, describing her as "a eomedienne with an exquisite sense of humor", while praising her naturalness in acting. Afterward she played in Maggie Pepper (1911), which critic Percy Hammond writing for the Chicago Tribune did not consider a good play nor entertainment, yet believed the inclusion of Stahl, who played her role "most appealingly", made it a "diversion of no unwholesome type". In 1914, she played the role of Lucille Higgins in A Perfect Lady; in this play, she received an encore with the Reading Times commenting that "no one on the stage has quite the plaintive voice that is so characteristic to this great actress", noting that she was not taken seriously a decade prior.

As with many turn of the century stage stars, Stahl showed no interest in the new medium of motion pictures when the fledgling studios came courting stage stars around 1912. Like David Warfield, she starred in a handful of plays, became famous for them, and played them for many years.

Personal life
Stahl was married twice. First to E. P. Sullivan, an actor famous for starring in the hugely popular play and later (1916) film The Black Crook; they divorced in the mid-1890s.

Her second husband was William Bonelli, an actor whom she wed on October 17, 1895 in Hudson, New Jersey. This marriage lasted until Bonelli's death. She bore no children in either marriage. 

Her father died in 1921 in a New York hospital at the age of 77, survived by Stahl's sister and three brothers.

Note
In the 1980 film Somewhere in Time, Christopher Reeve played a journalist researching an Edwardian actress in the library of a large hotel. Reeve pulls out a cache of photos and one of the photos shows a child standing holding a doll. The child is Stahl; the same photo appears in Stahl's biographical entry in Daniel Blum's 1954 2nd edition Great Stars of the American Stage.

References

External links
Reading materials and a photograph
Rose Stahl photo gallery NYP Library Billy Rose Collection.
NY Times(click the download high resolution PDF link to read)

1868 births
1955 deaths
20th-century American actresses
19th-century American actresses
American stage actresses
Actresses from Chicago
Date of death missing
Place of death missing
American people of German descent
American people of Irish descent
American people of Scottish descent
Canadian emigrants to the United States